Tonypandy railway station is a railway station serving the town of Tonypandy in south Wales. It is located on the Rhondda Line. The station cannot be directly accessed from Tonypandy, a scenic bridge over the river Rhondda must be used as the station adjoins a mountain.

History
The original Pandy station was opened in 1841 by the Taff Vale Railway, and was situated opposite Walter Coffin's Dinas Middle Colliery. The station was closed in 1886 and later demolished, to be replaced by Dinas Station, built about 200 yards to the north. The Tonypandy and Trealaw station, built of red bricks and opened in 1908, was opposite the entrance to Foundry Road at the centre of two bridges, one of which crossed the river to Tonypandy and the other which crossed the railway lines to Judges’ Hall and to Trealaw. This was demolished and replaced by the current station during major roadworks in the 1980s.

Services
Monday-Saturday, there is a half-hourly service to  &  southbound and to  northbound. There is a two hourly service in each direction on Sundays, with through trains to  southbound. On 20 July 2018, previous franchise operator Arriva Trains Wales announced a trial period of extra Sunday services on the Rhondda Line to Cardiff and Barry Island. This was in response to a survey by Leanne Wood and the success of extra Sunday services on the Merthyr Line and the Rhymney Line.

References

External links

Railway stations in Rhondda Cynon Taf
DfT Category F1 stations
Former Taff Vale Railway stations
Railway stations in Great Britain opened in 1908
Railway stations served by Transport for Wales Rail